Mason Webb (born May 6, 1986) is an American former professional soccer player.  He currently plays for Surrey United Firefighters. Upon playing midfield in his youth career, Mason has moved to an outside fullback position where he has been regarded as one of the top defenders in the VMSL.  Earning the top point scorer as a defender, netting two goals, and getting nine assists for a total of 13 points, during the 2011 season VMSL season. His accuracy in passing and crossing, his speed going forward and closing down attackers, and his control on and off the ball have led to him to the nickname "the Jag," short for the Jaguar.

Career
He played one year with Snohomish United and served as the team captain in four of his five years with WFC Rangers. As a midfielder, Mason also played four years on the Washington state and US Region IV Olympic Development Program (ODP) teams. In 2004, Mason received a full scholarship to Oregon State University alongside current soccer players, Ryan Johnson (Portland Timbers and Jamaica national football team), Robbie Findley (Real Salt Lake and United States men's national soccer team), Bryan Jordan (San Antonio Scorpions and United States men's national under-23 soccer team), Daniel Leach (Barnet, Dover Athletic, U-17 Australian National Team). He has played alongside twin brother, and former American professional soccer player, Nick Webb for most of his career.

Mason played for the USL-1 League Champions Vancouver Whitecaps in 2008. He took one year off of soccer to finish his undergraduate study at Oregon State while he still had a scholarship, earning his Bachelor of Science in Psychology.  Upon graduation, Mason moved back to Bellingham WA, and has played for 2-time VMSL League and Imperial Cup Champions, the Surrey United Firefighters

Personal life
He is the twin brother of Nick Webb.

Notes

1986 births
Living people
Oregon State Beavers men's soccer players
Vancouver Whitecaps (1986–2010) players
Vancouver Whitecaps Residency players
Sportspeople from Bellingham, Washington
USL First Division players
USL League Two players
Twin sportspeople
American soccer players
American expatriate soccer players
Expatriate soccer managers in Canada
American expatriate sportspeople in Canada
Soccer players from Washington (state)
Association football defenders
Association football midfielders
American soccer coaches